John Donelson Martin (1830–1862) was a Confederate States Army officer during the American Civil War.

Early life
John Martin was born on August 18, 1830, in Davidson County, Tennessee. He was the middle child of Major James G. Martin (1791–1840) and Catherine Donelson Martin. In 1846 he volunteered for the Mexican–American War, serving as a private in the 3rd Tennessee Infantry Regiment (Company D) until war's end in 1848.

Civil War
When the American Civil War erupted in 1861 Martin joined the Confederate States Army and was named Captain of the Hickory Rifles, a company of infantry from Memphis and Shelby County. It soon became Company E of the 154th Senior Tennessee Infantry Regiment; Martin himself becoming the regiment's Major in May 1861.

During the summer Martin raised a regiment with 7 companies from Mississippi and 3 from Tennessee. He was promoted to Colonel and assigned to command this unit; known as 25th Mississippi Infantry (also as 1st Mississippi Valley Regiment). In January 1862 it was renamed 2nd Confederate Infantry.

Fighting in the Battle of Shiloh Martin took over brigade command when his commander, Brigadier John S. Bowen, was wounded. His services were noted and he was recommended for promotion to brigadier general. Simultaneously, he was named acting brigadier general and assigned to command a brigade in the Army of the West, composed of the 36th, 37th and 38th Mississippi regiments as well as the 37th Alabama Infantry.

Colonel Martin was killed in the Second Battle of Corinth on October 3, 1862, while leading his men. He was buried on Elmwood Cemetery in Memphis; leaving behind his widow and his son, who died at the age of 32 years, just like his father. His grandson was Judge John Donelson Martin, Sr.

See also
John Donelson Martin, Sr.
List of American Civil War generals (Confederate)

Notes

References
 Eicher, John H., and David J. Eicher, Civil War High Commands. Stanford: Stanford University Press, 2001. .
 Sifakis, Stewart. Who Was Who in the Civil War. New York: Facts On File, 1988. .
 Warner, Ezra J. Generals in Gray: Lives of the Confederate Commanders. Baton Rouge: Louisiana State University Press, 1959. .

External links
 

1830 births
1862 deaths
American military personnel of the Mexican–American War
Confederate States Army brigadier generals
People from Davidson County, Tennessee
People of Tennessee in the American Civil War
Confederate States of America military personnel killed in the American Civil War